Gmina Biszcza is a rural gmina (administrative district) in Biłgoraj County, Lublin Voivodeship, in eastern Poland.

Villages
Gmina Biszcza contains the villages and settlements of Biszcza, Budziarze, Bukowina, Gózd Lipiński, Suszka, Wola Kulońska, Wólka Biska and Żary.

Neighbouring gminas
Gmina Biszcza is bordered by the gminas of Biłgoraj, Harasiuki, Księżpol, Kuryłówka, Potok Górny and Tarnogród.

References
Polish official population figures 2006

Biszcza
Biłgoraj County